Prof. Dr. Hilde (Hildegard) Zaloscer (Zaloszer) (15 June 1903 – 20 December 1999) was an art historian, Egyptologist, Coptologist, essayist, novelist and a prominent expert of Coptic history and art.

Biography
Zaloscer was born in Tuzla, Bosnia Herzegovina (then Austria-Hungary), the eldest daughter of the affluent Jewish lawyer and state-official Dr. Jacob and his wife Bertha (née Kallach). Since her father was a state official and a known Austrian monarchist, the family had to flee to Vienna when the Austrian monarchy collapsed, at the end of the First World War (1918). Her family settled in Vienna, where she finished her secondary education and studied art history and prehistory at the Vienna University (Ph.D. 1926, her dissertation being "Die frühmittelalterliche Dreistreifenornamentik der Mittelmeerrandgebiete mit besonderer Berücksichtigung der Denkmäler am Balkan").

From 1927 to 1936, Zaloscer was the editor of the art magazine Belvedere, and corresponded with Thomas Mann. Due to the rise of anti-Semitism in Vienna she emigrated to Egypt in 1936. According to an article penned by author Judith Belfkih for the Wiener Zeitung, the Jewish Museum Vienna determined that Zaloscer was one of at least 13 women who undertook "fictitious marriages" to escape Nazi persecution through emigration during World War II:

What almost unites them all: the women were silent for a long time about their fictitious marriages and the resulting double lives - to protect the children or the later partners. The motivation of the women was clear: they fought for survival and deliberately accepted the many risks - from denunciation of extortion and sexual assault - to their safety....

The biographies traced in the exhibition certainly convey the image of extremely self-confident and equally courageous women - by the political activist and writer Hilda Monte, the later doctor Rosl Ebner or the art historian Hilde Zaloscer, who was professionally married to Egyptian exile.

Between 1946 and 1968, Zaloscer was a professor of art history at the University of Alexandria where she became a prominent and world-renowned expert on Coptic art.

After the Six Day War (1967), she was expelled from Egypt since she was Jewish. She lived temporarily in Vienna from 1968 to 1970 and, in the following two years, Zaloscer was a professor at the Carleton University in Ottawa, Ontario, Canada, before returning to Vienna.

From 1975 to 1978, she was a lecturer at the University of Vienna. Zaloscer was a prolific essayist and writer and among others was an editor of the Encyclopedia Coptica.

Awards and honors

 Theodor-Körner Prize (Austria)
 Adolf-Schärf Prize
 The Golden Honorary Doctorate of the Vienna University
 Goldenes Verdienstkreuz des Landes Wien
 Kulturmedaille der Stadt Linz

Publications

 Zaloscer, Hilde   Visuelle Beschwörung, autonomes Kunstwerk, Ideograph   1997
 Zaloscer, Hilde   Wissenschaftliche Arbeit ohne wissenschaftlichen Apparat   2004
 Zaloscer, Hilde   Zu ägyptischen Totenmasken   1999
 Zaloscer, Hilde   Ägyptische Textilkunst   1993
 Zaloscer, Hilde   Ägyptische Wirkereien   1962
 Zaloscer, Hilde   Die Antithetik im Werke Thomas Manns   1959
 Zaloscer, Hilde   Das dreimalige Exil   2004
 Zaloscer, Hilde   Eine Heimkehr gibt es nicht  1988
 Zaloscer, Hilde   La Femme au voile dans l’iconographie copte   1955
 Zaloscer, Hilde   Die frühmittelalterliche Dreistreifornamentik der Mittelmeerrandgebiete mit besonderer Berücksichtigung der Denkmäler am Balkan 1926
 Zaloscer, Hilde   Le Greco   1946
 Zaloscer, Hilde   Die Kunst im christlichen Ägypten   1974
 Zaloscer, Hilde   Kunstgeschichte und Nationalsozialismus   2004
 Zaloscer, Hilde   Porträts aus dem Wüstensand   1961
 Zaloscer, Hilde   Le "Doctor Faustus" de Thomas Mann et ses modèles   1953
 Zaloscer, Hilde   De la composition musicale dans les oeuvres littéraires    1953
 Zaloscer, Hilde   Quelques considérations sur les rapports entre l’art copte et les Indes  1947

References

Coptologists
Austrian Egyptologists
University of Vienna alumni
Writers from Vienna
People from Alexandria
Austrian Jews
Austrian women historians
Austrian people of Bosnia and Herzegovina-Jewish descent
1903 births
1999 deaths
Academic staff of Alexandria University
Academic staff of Carleton University
Academic staff of the University of Vienna
Bosnia and Herzegovina Jews
20th-century Austrian historians
Austrian emigrants to Egypt